Knieja may refer to the following places:
Knieja, Tuchola County in Kuyavian-Pomeranian Voivodeship (north-central Poland)
Knieja, Żnin County in Kuyavian-Pomeranian Voivodeship (north-central Poland)
Knieja, Silesian Voivodeship (south Poland)
Knieja, Opole Voivodeship (south-west Poland)
Knieja, Człuchów County in Pomeranian Voivodeship (north Poland)
Knieja, Kościerzyna County in Pomeranian Voivodeship (north Poland)
Knieja, West Pomeranian Voivodeship (north-west Poland)